In geometry, the gyroelongated pentagonal rotunda is one of the Johnson solids (J25). As the name suggests, it can be constructed by gyroelongating a pentagonal rotunda (J6) by attaching a decagonal antiprism to its base. It can also be seen as a gyroelongated pentagonal birotunda (J48) with one pentagonal rotunda removed.

Dual polyhedron 

The dual of the gyroelongated pentagonal rotunda has 30 faces: 10 pentagons, 10 rhombi, and 10 quadrilaterals.

External links
 

Johnson solids